Igwuruta is a town in Ikwerre, Rivers State, Nigeria. It is located near Omagwa, a community hosting the Port Harcourt International Airport. Its geographic coordinates are:  (4.9543911, 7.0126247). Schools found around this area include: Brookstone School Secondary, Charles Dale Memorial International School, Springflowers International Schools, Queens International High School, Ozulems International Montessori School, Beryl Education Centre and
Evidence Bloom School.

See also
Ikwerre people
Ikwerre, Rivers State

References

Towns in Rivers State